This is a list of open-source hardware projects, including computer systems and components, cameras, radio, telephony, science education, machines and tools, robotics, renewable energy, home automation, medical and biotech, automotive, prototyping, test equipment, and musical instruments.

Communications

Amateur radio
 Homebrew D-STAR Radio
 HackRF_One

Audio electronics
 Monome 40h – reconfigurable grid of 64 backlit buttons, used via USB; a limited batch of 500 was produced; all design process, specifications, firmware, and PCB schematics are available online
 Neuros Digital Audio Computer – portable digital audio player
 Arduinome
 MIDIbox – modular DIY hardware–software platform for MIDI devices including controllers, synthesizers, sequencers

Telephony

 Openmoko – phone framework (first use case: First International Computer (FIC) Neo FreeRunner, released as of mid-2008
 OpenBTS and OsmoBTS – software-based GSM base stations
 Project Ara – modular design, hot swapping pluggable mobile phone; due to enter trial production in 2015, but was suspended in 2016
 PiPhone and ZeroPhone
 Telecom Infra Project – collaborative Open Compute Project focusing on optical broadband networks and open cellular networks to create global access
PinePhone – developed by computer manufacturer Pine64, intended for allowing the user to have full hardware and software control over the device, released as of end-2019

Video electronics
 Milkymist One – video synthesizer for interactive and dance-directed VJing
 Neuros OSD – digital video recorder

Networking
 NetFPGA – hardware platform, software, community, and education material to enable research and education effort in a line-rate network environment

Wireless networking
 OpenPicus – platform for smart sensors and Internet of things
 Sun SPOT – hardware–software platform for sensor networks and battery powered, wireless, embedded development
 USRP – universal software radio peripheral is a mainboard with snap in modules providing software defined radio at different frequencies, has USB 2.0 link to a host computer
 PowWow Power Optimized Hardware and Software FrameWork for Wireless Motes – hardware–software platform for wireless sensor networks
 Twibright RONJA – free-space optic system, DIY in a garage and maker culture, 10 Mbit/s full duplex/1.4 km
 SatNOGS – software-hardware project of a global low Earth orbit satellite ground station, including for data and Internet

Electronics

Cameras
 AXIOM – digital cinema camera built by apertus° community
 Elphel, Inc. – cameras based on free hardware–software designs

Computer systems

 Arduino – open-source microcontroller board
 Chumby – information ambient device
 CUBIT – multitouch surface-interaction system
 Libre Computer Project – open-source, open-hardware single-board_computers
 Netduino – microcontroller board, .NET Micro Framework based
 NodeMCU – Wi-Fi microcontroller board
 Novena – an ARM based computer built by Andrew Huang and associates
 OpenPOWER – Power ISA, an open-source hardware instruction set architecture (ISA) initiated by IBM
 OpenSPARC – Sun's, later Oracle's high-performance processor
 Parallax Propeller – a multi-core microcontroller with eight 32-bit RISC cores
 Parallella – single-board computer with a manycore coprocessor and field-programmable gate array (FPGA)
 Raspberry Pi – a series of small single-board computers developed in the United Kingdom by the Raspberry Pi Foundation in association with Broadcom
 SparkFun Electronics – microcontroller development boards, breakout boards
 The Bus Pirate – universal bus interface and programmer
 Turris Omnia – open-source SOHO network router
 RISC-V – an open-source hardware instruction set architecture (ISA)
 MIPS – a reduced instruction set computer (RISC) instruction set architecture
 Color Maximite – open-source single-board computer running the BASIC language as its operating system and compatible with Arduino Uno micro-controller peripherals
 Humane Reader and Humane PC

Peripherals
 Nitrokey – USB key for data and email encryption and strong authentication

Robotics

 ArduCopter – Arduino-based drone
 e-puck mobile robot – mobile robot designed for education
 ICub – 1 metre high humanoid robot
 IOIO – a board that allows Android applications to interface with external electronics
 Orb swarm – art spherical robots
 OpenRAVE
 RobotCub – predecessor of ICub
 Spykee
 multiplo 
 OpenROV – telerobotic submarine
 Thymio – robot for education
 Tinkerforge – a platform comprising stackable microcontrollers for interfacing with sensors and other I/O devices

Environmental
 Open Source Ecology

Renewable energy
 Wind turbines

Lighting and LED
 LED Throwies – nondestructive graffiti and light displays

Neither electronic nor mechanical

Architecture and design
 WikiHouse – project to design and build houses
 Opendesk – furniture project
 OpenStructures – design from furniture to house

Domotics

Machines and production tools

Automotive

Complete vehicles

Land

 Rally Fighter – made by Local Motors
 Riversimple Urban Car
 OpenXC
 OScar
 Wikispeed
 OSVehicle Tabby

Airplanes
 MakerPlane

Engine control units
SECU-3 – gasoline engine control unit

Electric vehicle chargers
 OpenEVSE – charger for electric cars

3D printers and scanners
 RepRap project – 3D printer-fabber; recyclebots, like the Lyman filament extruder, provide the filament for RepRaps
 LulzBot – 3D printer design by Aleph Objects; is Respects Your Freedom certified by the Free Software Foundation

Other hardware

 Multimachine – machine tool project
 Open Source Ecology's Global Village Construction Set (GVCS) – 50 industrial machines needed to build a small civilization with modern comforts
 Precious Plastic's – plastic recycling tools – Shredder, Extruder, Injector, Compressor, and supplemental resources
 Defense Distributed/Liberator (gun)
 Charon (gun)
 FGC-9 (gun)

Science

Medical devices

 Open Prosthetics Project – design of open-source prosthetics
 Open-source ventilator

Scientific hardware
 Open-Source Lab – documents dozens of scientific tools, but is closed-source itself
 OpenBCI – EEG amplifier

Satellite
 UPSat

See also
 Open-Source Lab: How to Build Your Own Hardware and Reduce Research Costs (2014)
 Thingiverse, open-source designs of objects, many of which are 3D-printable

References

External links
 
 Open modular hardware

 
Computing-related lists
Hacker culture